The Mayor of L'Aquila is an elected politician who, along with the L'Aquila City Council, is accountable for the strategic government of L'Aquila in Abruzzo, Italy, capital city of the region. The current Mayor is Pierluigi Biondi from the far-right party Brothers of Italy, who took office on 28 June 2017.

Overview
According to the Italian Constitution, the Mayor of L'Aquila is member of the City Council.

The Mayor is elected by the population of L'Aquila, who also elects the members of the City Council, controlling the Mayor's policy guidelines and is able to enforce his resignation by a motion of no confidence. The Mayor is entitled to appoint and release the members of his government.

Since 1994 the Mayor is elected directly by L'Aquila's electorate: in all mayoral elections in Italy in cities with a population higher than 15,000 the voters express a direct choice for the mayor or an indirect choice voting for the party of the candidate's coalition. If no candidate receives at least 50% of votes, the top two candidates go to a second round after two weeks. The election of the City Council is based on a direct choice for the candidate with a preference vote: the candidate with the majority of the preferences is elected. The number of the seats for each party is determined proportionally.

1266–1945

Italian Republic (since 1945)

City Council election (1945–1994)
From 1945 to 1994, the Mayor of L'Aquila was elected by the City's Council.

Direct election (since 1994)
Since 1994, under provisions of new local administration law, the Mayor of L'Aquila is chosen by direct election.

See also
 Timeline of L'Aquila

References

L'Aquila
Mayors of places in Abruzzo
Politics of Abruzzo